Zwelivelile "Mandla" Mandela, MP (born 21 June 1974) is the tribal chief of the Mvezo Traditional Council and the grandson of Nelson Mandela. He graduated from Rhodes University with a degree in Politics in 2007.

Succession to the chieftaincy

His father, Makgatho Mandela, died in 2005, which paved his way to the headship of the clan. As the tribe did not discuss electing a member from the Mandela family until 2007, he was chosen as successor. Nelson Mandela had given up the right of Thembu leader nearly 70 years prior to fight white rule in South Africa. As the tribe now looked to him to reclaim his title, he suggested his grandson assume the role. When the younger Mandela became chief in 2007, he was only 32 years old and most of his duties were said to involve tribal ceremonies, settling disputes among clan members, and representing the tribe on political issues.

Career and education
Mandela has been a member of parliament for the African National Congress since the 2009 election.

Prior to both his succession to the chieftaincy and his election to parliament, he attended Waterford Kamhlaba, a United World College in Swaziland (now Eswatini), until 1995.

Personal life 
His first wife is Tando Mabuna-Mandela. They married in June 2004 in a civil ceremony. She successfully filed for divorce in 2018, and the annulment of his other marriages.

His second wife is Anaïs Grimaud, a French citizen born in 1990 in Réunion, who changed her name to Nkosikazi Nobubele. They married in March 2010 in a traditional ceremony. She gave birth in September 2011 to Qheya II Zanethemba Mandela, who was presented to his great grandfather Nelson Mandela at a naming ceremony in Qunu. In August 2012 he denied paternity, claiming it was the result of an affair with his brother.

His third wife is Mbali Makhathini (or, as she is otherwise styled, Nkosikazi Nodiyala Mandela), whom he married on 24 December 2011 at Mvezo.

On 6 February 2016, he married his fourth wife, Raabia Clarke in an Islamic ceremony in Cape Town. Mandela converted to Islam about two months prior to the wedding, a requisite to marry into the Islamic community.

Grave controversy 
Members of the Mandela family approached the Mthatha High Court in July 2013 to force Mandela to return the remains of three of Nelson Mandela's children to Qunu. Mandela had moved them to Mvezo, without consulting the Mandela family in 2011. The family also laid a criminal case of tampering with a grave. A South African High Court judge, Judge Lusindiso Phakade, ruled in favour of the complainants. He ordered Mandela to exhume and rebury the bodies at Qunu.

References

External links
Mandela's grandson a Xhosa chief
Mandela family united by grief and fight against Aids
Mandela's legacy

1974 births
Living people
People from Soweto
Xhosa people
African National Congress politicians
Members of the National Assembly of South Africa
Rhodes University alumni
Mandla
South African Muslims
Converts to Islam
Waterford Kamhlaba alumni
People educated at a United World College